Allan Coulter (born 15 December 1959) is a Canadian volleyball player. He competed at the 1984 Summer Olympics and the 1992 Summer Olympics.

References

External links
 

1959 births
Living people
Canadian men's volleyball players
Olympic volleyball players of Canada
Volleyball players at the 1984 Summer Olympics
Volleyball players at the 1992 Summer Olympics
Volleyball players from Toronto